Aanchal Munjal  is an Indian film and television actress, acting in both Hindi and Tamil films.

Career
Munjal started acting as a child. Munjal's first television role was as Sameera in Dhoom Machaao Dhoom in 2008. 

Her breakthrough performance was in 2010's We Are Family, based on the 1998 Hollywood film Stepmom. That same year, she appeared as Chunni in Ghost Bana Dost and Muniya S. Yadav in Hindi film Aarakshan. From 2011 until 2013, she played Raavi Ahuja in Parvarrish – Kuchh Khattee Kuchh Meethi.

She appeared in  Bade Achhe Lagte Hain for the 2013 season.

Filmography

Films

Television

Awards and nominations
2012 Indian Telly Awards for Indian Telly Award for Best Child Artiste - Female for Raavi Ahuja in Parvarrish – Kuchh Khattee Kuchh Meethi (won)
2012 Indian Television Academy Awards for Most Promising Child Star as Anjali Dobrial in Gumrah: End of Innocence (nom)

References

External links
 
 
 
 "Aanchal Munjal: Want to play every possible character on earth" from The Statesman
 Instagram

Living people
Place of birth missing (living people)
Indian film actresses
Actresses in Hindi cinema
Indian television actresses
21st-century Indian actresses
1997 births